James Maurice Quinlan (May 1, 1934 – March 29, 2020) was an American journalist, writer and screenwriter. Quinlan wrote the screenplay for the 1996 movie Michael starring John Travolta.

Biography 
Jim Quinlan was born and raised in St. Louis, Missouri. His father was a bank examiner. He also lived with his mother and his sister. In 1949, he moved to Chicago and attended Fenwick High School. He also competed in the Chicago Golden Gloves boxing tournament. Later, he attended Loyola University Chicago, where he graduated in 1957. In 1969, he moved to North Palm Beach where he worked for the Palm Beach Times, and later the Palm Beach Post, becoming the city editor of the latter in 1977 after a successful human interest column. In 1980 he moved back to Chicago where he worked at the Chicago Sun-Times. Quinlan also worked for the Philadelphia Daily News and the Albuquerque Journal for short periods, winning the E.H. Shaffer award at the latter He had four children, all of whom with his first wife; he then moved to Bradenton, Florida with his second wife, where he wrote for the Sarasota Herald-Tribune. He died on March 29, 2020.

Works 
Books
Spying on Fishback
The Trout Snout Caper
Screenplays
Michael

References

External links
  Jim Quinlan IMDb
  Jim Quinlan MovieFone
 Jim Quinlan Artist Direct

1934 births
2020 deaths
American male journalists
Loyola University Chicago alumni
Writers from St. Louis
People from Bradenton, Florida
People from North Palm Beach, Florida
Screenwriters from Florida
Screenwriters from Missouri